30th London Film Critics Circle Awards
18 February 2010

Film of the Year: 
 A Prophet 

British Film of the Year: 
 Fish Tank 
The 30th London Film Critics Circle Awards, honouring the best in film for 2009, were announced by the London Film Critics Circle on 18 February 2010.

Winners and nominees

Film of the Year
A Prophet
Avatar
The Hurt Locker
Up in the Air
The White Ribbon

British Film of the Year
Fish Tank
Bright Star
An Education
In the Loop
Moon

Foreign Language Film of the Year
Let the Right One In • SwedenThe Class • France
Katyń • Poland
A Prophet • France
The White Ribbon • Austria

Director of the YearKathryn Bigelow - The Hurt Locker
Jacques Audiard - A Prophet
James Cameron - Avatar
Michael Haneke - The White Ribbon
Jason Reitman - Up in the Air

British Director of the Year
Andrea Arnold - Fish Tank
Armando Iannucci - In the Loop
Duncan Jones - Moon
Kevin Macdonald - State of Play
Sam Taylor Wood - Nowhere Boy

Screenwriter of the Year
Jesse Armstrong, Simon Blackwell, Armando Iannucci & Tony Roche - In the Loop
Nick Hornby - An Education
Jacques Audiard - A Prophet
Joel Coen & Ethan Coen - A Serious Man
Michael Haneke - The White Ribbon

Breakthrough British Filmmaker
Duncan Jones - Moon
Daniel Barber - Harry Brown
Armando Iannucci - In the Loop
Peter Strickland - Katalin Varga
Sam Taylor Wood - Nowhere Boy

Actor of the Year
Christoph Waltz - Inglourious Basterds
Jeff Bridges - Crazy Heart
George Clooney - Up in the Air
Tahar Rahim - A Prophet
Michael Stuhlbarg - A Serious Man

Actress of the Year
Mo'Nique - Precious
Abbie Cornish - Bright Star
Vera Farmiga - Up in the Air
Carey Mulligan - An Education
Meryl Streep - Julie & Julia

British Actor of the Year
Colin Firth - A Single Man
Peter Capaldi - In the Loop
Tom Hardy - Bronson
Christian McKay - Me and Orson Welles
Andy Serkis - Sex & Drugs & Rock & Roll

British Actress of the Year
Carey Mulligan - An Education
Emily Blunt - The Young Victoria
Katie Jarvis - Fish Tank
Helen Mirren - The Last Station
Kristin Scott Thomas - Nowhere Boy

British Supporting Actor of the Year
Michael Fassbender - Fish Tank
John Hurt - 44 Inch Chest
Jason Isaacs - Good
Alfred Molina - An Education
Timothy Spall - The Damned United

British Supporting Actress of the Year
Anne-Marie Duff - Nowhere Boy
Emily Blunt - Sunshine Cleaning
Rosamund Pike - An Education
Kierston Wareing - Fish Tank
Olivia Williams - An Education

Young British Performer of the Year
Katie Jarvis - Fish Tank
Aaron Johnson - Nowhere Boy and Dummy
Bill Milner - Sex & Drugs & Rock & Roll and Is Anybody There?
George MacKay - The Boys Are Back
Saoirse Ronan - The Lovely Bones

30th Year Anniversary Award (Best of the winners since 1980)
Apocalypse Now
Schindler's List
The Lives of Others
Unforgiven
Brokeback Mountain
Cinema Paradiso
L.A. Confidential
Fargo
Distant Voices, Still Lives
The King of Comedy

Dilys Powell Award
Quentin Tarantino

References

2
2009 film awards
2009 in British cinema
2009 in London